Franck Lafitte  (born 8 March 1989) is a French male volleyball player. He was part of the France men's national volleyball team at the 2014 FIVB Volleyball Men's World Championship in Poland. He played for Montpellier UC.

Clubs
 Montpellier UC (2014)

References

1989 births
Living people
French men's volleyball players
Place of birth missing (living people)
Olympic volleyball players of France
Volleyball players at the 2016 Summer Olympics
Mediterranean Games bronze medalists for France
Mediterranean Games medalists in volleyball
Competitors at the 2013 Mediterranean Games
Middle blockers
People from Saint-Martin-d'Hères
Sportspeople from Isère